The 2013 Cornell Big Red football team represented Cornell University in the 2013 NCAA Division I FCS football season as a member of the Ivy League. They were led by first-year head coach David Archer and played their home games at Schoellkopf Field. Cornell finished the  season with a record of 3–7 overall and 2–5 in Ivy League play to place seventh. Cornell averaged 7,002 fans per game.

Schedule

References

Cornell
Cornell Big Red football seasons
Cornell Big Red football